Crone Woods, or Crone Forest, is located in the northeastern section of the Wicklow Mountains, just below the summit of Maulin , in Wicklow in the Ireland. Crone Woods have an extensive network of forest trails and hikes which can be accessed from the village of Enniskerry.

Description
The woods were once part of the Powerscourt Estate with records from the 13th-century showing the area was set aside as a royal hunting ground.  Use of the woods for cover during the 1798 Rebellion led to the creation of the military road through northern Wicklow Mountains with several barracks to open up the region. The forest is owned and operated by Coillte, the Irish state forestry agency.

Trails in the wood include several to 'Ride Rock', from which there are views down into Powerscourt Waterfall. Other trails lead to the summit of Maulin.

The wood is also used by hill-walkers completing the 16-kilometre loop of Maulin, Tonduff , War Hill  and Djouce , which is sometimes called the 'Circuit of Glensoulan'.

Gallery

See also
List of forests in Ireland
Lists of long-distance trails in the Republic of Ireland

References

External links
Crone Woods Map and Trails Coillte (July 2019)
 

Forests and woodlands of the Republic of Ireland